Dasari is a Vaishnava mendicant caste in Telangana region and Andhra Pradesh, India. They are involved in various business, trades, poojas, marriage rituals, plays and agriculture. They are also known as Poosala Balija, Bukka Dasari, and Krishna Balija in different areas of their habitation.

The history of Dasari caste dates back to centuries.

See also
 List of Telugu castes

References

Social groups of Andhra Pradesh
Social groups of Telangana